Engeløy Airport, Grådussan  is an airport located on the northwest tip of Engeløya, an island in Steigen municipality, Nordland county, Norway.

The airport was built in 2009 and opened in earnest in 2010. It has a grass runway designated 05/23 which measures . The airport is usable most of the year, but runway conditions must always be checked in advance. Approval from the owners is required before use (PPR).

References

Airports in Nordland
Airports in the Arctic
Airports established in 2009
2009 establishments in Norway
Steigen